Byblos Club is a multi sports club based in Byblos, Lebanon. The franchise was established in 1981, and such notable stars played as Jay Youngblood, Michael Fraser, Bassel Bawji, Ali Mahmoud, Rodrigue Akl, Ratko Varda, Steven Burtt, Joseph Vogel, Ndudi Ebi, and Ekenechukwu Ibekwe have played for the club throughout its young history.

Franchise history
In 2017, Byblos won the Lebanese basketball Division 2 and qualified for the Division 1. In the following year, Byblos won the Division 2 championship and qualified for the first time for the Lebanese Basketball League as  part of the 2010–11 Lebanese Basketball League Division 1.

During the 2014–16 FLB Div.A season, Byblos Club was named UBA (Union Byblos Amchit) since Amchit Club's basketball team was part of Byblos Club during that season for obligatory financial reasons. The season saw the signing of coach Nenad Vucinic and the resigning of Jay Youngblood. UBA finished the season with 8 win and 0 losses, finishing the league in third. During the playoffs they faced the struggling Tadamon Zouk in a 3–0 swipe, in semi-finals they faced the Lebanese powerhouse Sagesse Beirut, during the playoffs UBA signed Ratko Varda, UBA shocked the Lebanese basketball by swiping Sagesse 4–0 and face Riyadi Beirut in the finals for the first time in their history. the series ended 4–1 to Riyadi Beirut.

The 2015–16 season saw Amchit Basketball club parted ways with Byblos and they were relegated to division 4. Byblos added Steven Burtt, Sherwood Brown, and Bassel Bawji. Byblos and Sagesse faced each other in the cup final, just like they met a week ago in the Henri Chalhoub Tournament Final where Byblos won the game, Byblos defeated Sagesse for the cup and they faced Al Riyadi for super cup against the Lebanese champions. Byblos won the game. Byblos finished the season 8–7. They entered the playoffs for the sixth straight year. However, they were defeated 3–2 in the quarterfinals of the playoffs by Mouttahed Tripoli.

In 2016–17 season, Byblos finished the season strong with a 13–5 record. In the playoffs, Byblos beat Tadamon Zouk in the quarterfinals of the playoffs and then they faced the defending champions, the Riyadi, who were eliminated 3–1.

Squad

Depth chart

Achievements
 Lebanese Basketball Second Division 2 (1): 2009–2010
 Lebanese Cup Winner (1): 2016
 Lebanese SuperCup Winner (1): 2016
 Henri Chalhoub Tournament (2): 2015, 2016

External links

Basketball teams in Lebanon
Basketball teams established in 1981
1981 establishments in Lebanon